William Spencer Satch  (born 9 June 1989) is a British rower and Olympic gold medallist.

Rowing career
Satch was educated at Shiplake College near Henley-on-Thames in southeast Oxfordshire. His rowing coach was New Zealand gold medallist Shane O'Brien, who was deputy headmaster at Shiplake College. Satch rows for Leander Club in Henley-on-Thames, and was appointed a vice-captain of the club in 2018.

Satch won the bronze medal, rowing with George Nash in the coxless pair at the 2012 Summer Olympics.

In September 2013 Satch stroked the GB men's eight to the gold medal at the World Rowing Championships in Chungju, Korea and repeated the gold at the World Rowing Championships in Amsterdam in 2014. He was part of the British team (at stroke) that topped the medal table at the 2015 World Rowing Championships at Lac d'Aiguebelette in France, where he won a gold medal as part of the eight that gained a hat-trick of wins over the German Olympic champions. The crew was Matt Gotrel, Constantine Louloudis, Pete Reed, Paul Bennett, Moe Sbihi, Alex Gregory, George Nash and Phelan Hill. 

In May 2016, he was part of the GB men's eight which won bronze at the European Championships. Later in 2016, he stroked the British men's eight to a gold medal at the 2016 Summer Olympics in Rio. He won a bronze medal at the 2017 World Rowing Championships in Sarasota, Florida, as part of the coxless four and then won a bronze medal at the 2018 World Rowing Championships in Plovdiv, Bulgaria, as part of the eight with James Rudkin, Alan Sinclair, Tom Ransley, Thomas George, Moe Sbihi, Oliver Wynne-Griffith, Matthew Tarrant and Henry Fieldman.

Awards

References

External links
Official website

1989 births
Living people
People from Henley-on-Thames
Members of Leander Club
English male rowers
British male rowers
Rowers at the 2012 Summer Olympics
Rowers at the 2016 Summer Olympics
Olympic rowers of Great Britain
Olympic medalists in rowing
Olympic bronze medallists for Great Britain
Medalists at the 2012 Summer Olympics
Medalists at the 2016 Summer Olympics
World Rowing Championships medalists for Great Britain
Olympic gold medallists for Great Britain
Members of the Order of the British Empire